Joseph Krivonak (July 30, 1918 – October 26, 1989) was an American football guard.  He played professionally for the Miami Seahawks of the All-America Football Conference (AAFC).

References

1918 births
1989 deaths
American football guards
Great Lakes Navy Bluejackets football players
Miami Seahawks players
South Carolina Gamecocks football players
Sportspeople from Erie, Pennsylvania
Players of American football from Pennsylvania